SAIC Motor Corp., Ltd. (formerly Shanghai Automotive Industry Corporation) is a Chinese state-owned automobile manufacturer headquartered in Anting, Shanghai. Founded in 1955, it is currently the largest of the "Big Four" state-owned car manufacturers of China, namely: SAIC Motor, FAW Group, Dongfeng Motor Corporation, and Changan Automobile, with car sales of 5.37 million, 3.50 million, 3.28 million and 2.30 million in 2021 respectively.

The company produces and sells vehicles under its own branding, such as Feifan, IM, Maxus, MG, Roewe, Baojun (under SGMW), Wuling (under SGMW), as well as under foreign-branded joint ventures such as SAIC-Volkswagen (Volkswagen, Skoda, Audi) and SAIC-General Motors (Buick, Chevrolet, Cadillac). In 2021, domestic-branded cars took 52% of sales. It also produces electric vehicles under some of the previously listed brandings, including dedicated EV brands such as Feifan and IM.

It is currently a Fortune Global 100 company, ranked 60 on the list. Including SGMW, it is also the third largest plug-in electric vehicle (BEV and PHEV) company and second largest BEV company in the world, with 10.5% and 13% global market share respectively in 2021, selling under brand names such as Wuling, Baojun, Maxus, MG, Roewe and Feifan.

SAIC traces its origins to the early years of the Chinese automobile industry in the 1940s, and SAIC was one of the few carmakers in Mao's China, making the Shanghai SH760. Currently, it participates in the oldest surviving sino-foreign car making joint venture, with Volkswagen, and in addition has had a joint venture with General Motors since 1998. SAIC products sell under a variety of brand names, including those of its joint venture partners. Two notable brands owned by SAIC itself are MG, a historic British car marque, and Roewe.

History

Origins to 2000
Although it has a long history, originating from an automobile assembly factory established in Shanghai sometime around World War II, SAIC, unlike domestic rivals FAW Group and Dongfeng Motors, has only recently attained a position of prominence in the Chinese vehicle industry. A small company in the 1970s, SAIC owes its rise to more than an increase in domestic demand for passenger vehicles. A cooperative agreement made with Volkswagen in 1984 followed by the formal establishment of Shanghai Volkswagen Automotive Co Ltd in March 1985 allowed it to produce competitive cars with foreign technology. Early success at SAIC may also be a result of guidance provided by local Shanghai authorities; at one time SAIC was simply an extension of the Shanghai Municipal government. For these two reasons and more, SAIC grew swiftly. In the 11 years leading to 1996, annual production capacity increased ten-fold to 300,000 units/year, and the company established itself as one of the leading Chinese automakers.

During this period, SAIC effectively built an entire modern automotive component supply chain in Shanghai from scratch, and the number and quality of locally produced auto parts rose significantly. Cars that were previously assembled in China from knock-down kits provisioned by Volkswagen became products built from parts produced in Shanghai, and between 1990 and 1996 the city more than doubled its contribution to the national output of automotive components. In 1987, the only local parts used in one car, the Volkswagen Santana, were tires, radio, and antenna, but by 1998 over 90% of the components used in its manufacture were locally sourced. A goal set by the Shanghai Municipal government, creation of a local parts industry is an example of the influence that the local government has had on the development of SAIC.

In June 1997, SAIC formed a second major joint venture, Shanghai General Motors Co Ltd, with General Motors. The new joint venture began operations in 1998, and helped to drive a doubling in SAIC's vehicle production between 2000 and 2004. Initially partnering with foreign automakers, creating joint ventures with component suppliers, such as the American Visteon, may now help underpin SAIC success.

2000 to 2010
At the start of the 2000s, SAIC made several acquisitions in Korea. In 2002 it participated in GM's purchase of Korean automaker Daewoo, acquiring a 10% stake in the newly formed GM Daewoo company for US$59.7 million, and in 2004 it also assumed control of an ailing South Korean automaker, SsangYong Motor, paying US$500 million for 48.9% ownership of the company. Around this time SAIC created a new holding company for its subsidiaries employed in passenger car production, Shanghai Automotive Group.

In the middle of the decade, SAIC attempted to acquire the British automaker MG Rover, but in 2005 was outbid by another Chinese automaker, Nanjing Automobile. SAIC did manage to obtain some MG Rover technology that was incorporated into a new line of luxury sedans sold under the Roewe marque, and it subsequently purchased the winning bidder.

While the company saw sales success in the late 2000s, with 2.72 million vehicles sold in 2009, its 2004 purchase of an ownership stake in a Korean SUV-maker, Ssangyong, soured. In January 2009, after an additional US$45 million was provided to it by SAIC, SsangYong Motor Company was placed into receivership in Korea. Courts might have mandated SAIC reduce its ownership, and by 2010 a 51.33% share of the Korean company had become a 10% one. The 2009 Ssangyong failure also saw riot police quell protesting Ssangyong workers who staged a 77-day-long sit in. SAIC may have benefitted from exposure to some technology from Mercedes that Ssangyong controlled during this time.

2010 to present
In 2010, SAIC  produced 3.58 million units, the largest output of any China-based automaker that year.

In June 2010, Magneti Marelli and Shanghai Automobile Gear Works (SAGW) officially launched a new joint venture plant in the Jiading district near Shanghai, China. SAGW, the main Chinese manufacturer of transmissions for the automotive sector, is a subsidiary of SAIC Motor.

In February 2011, SAIC unveiled a new commercial vehicles marque, Maxus.

On 13 April 2011, vehicle assembly resumed at the MG Motor UK Longbridge plant as the first MG 6 to be produced in the United Kingdom came off the production line, but ended in 2016 when SAIC moved production to China. it retained a technical subsidiary SAIC Motor UK on site until 2019.

In 2011, SAIC produced 3.97 million vehicles, the largest output of any China-based automaker that year.

In June 2012, SAIC's United States-based subsidiary Shanghai Automotive Industries Corp USA, Inc. opened a new North American Operations Center in Birmingham, Michigan. The opening ceremony was attended by Rick Snyder, Governor of Michigan, Oakland County Executive L. Brooks Patterson, and senior executives from General Motors and SAIC Motor. The 30,000-square-foot, three-story facility will house nearly 100 staff and focus on sourcing components.

In 2012, SAIC retained its top spot among domestic rivals by producing around 3.5 million units.

Mergers and company name-changes
The present-day SAIC is the product of numerous mergers and corporate re-structurings. Shanghai Internal Combustion Engine Components Company was founded in December 1955. In March 1958, Shanghai Internal Combustion Engine Components Company and Shanghai Powertrain Equipment Manufacturing Company were merged into Shanghai Powertrain Machinery Manufacturing Company. In January 1960, Shanghai Powertrain Machinery Manufacturing Company was renamed Shanghai Agricultural Machinery Manufacturing Company. In April 1969, Shanghai Agricultural Machinery Manufacturing Company was renamed Shanghai Tractor Industry Company. Shanghai Automobile & Tractor Company was established in July 1984.  In March 1990, Shanghai Automobile & Tractor Company was renamed Shanghai Automotive Industry Corporation. Shanghai Automotive Industry Corp (Group) was founded in September 1995.

Marques
SAIC sells vehicles under a variety of brands. Brand names that are exclusive to SAIC include Maxus, MG, Roewe, and Yuejin. Products produced by SAIC joint venture companies are sold under marques including Baojun, Buick, Chevrolet, Cadillac, Iveco, Škoda, Volkswagen, Audi, and Wuling.

Maxus

Maxus was formed in 2011 following the acquisition of LDV Group by SAIC in 2010, and produces MPVs, pickup trucks, and SUVs for both domestic sale and global export.

MG

MG Motor designs, develops and markets cars sold under the MG marque while vehicle manufacturing takes place at its factories in China and Thailand. MG Motor is the largest importer of Chinese made cars into the United Kingdom.

Rising Auto (Feifan, R Brand) 

Rising Auto (Feifan, 非凡), formerly R Brand, is an offshoot of SAIC's Roewe brand dedicated to new energy vehicles and intelligent vehicles. Early products are rebadged Roewes with the R7 crossover being the first original product. The upcoming following product is the F7 compact executive sedan.

Roewe

Roewe was introduced by SAIC in 2006. It is sold in most export markets outside China under the MG Motor marque.

Joint ventures
SAIC participates in cooperative efforts with foreign automakers that see the products of large international companies such as General Motors and Volkswagen made and sold in China.

The following is only a partial list.

iM (Zhiji Motor) 

SAIC launched a premium auto brand “IM” (dubbed “Zhiji Motor” in Chinese) jointly developed with  Shanghai's Pudong New Area government and Alibaba on January 13, 2021. During the brand launch, two concept vehicles under the IM brand were unveiled at the same time including an all-electric D-segment sedan and an all-electric crossover SUV. According to SAIC Motor, “IM” stands for Intelligence in Motion.

Shanghai Volkswagen Automotive 
A joint venture between SAIC and Volkswagen Group. It was founded in 1984 and produces cars under the Volkswagen, Skoda, and Audi brands.

Shanghai General Motors Corporation 

This joint venture between SAIC and General Motors manufactures and sells Chevrolet, Buick, and Cadillac brand automobiles in Mainland China.

SAIC-GM-Wuling Automobile (SGMW) 
A joint venture between SAIC, General Motors, and Liuzhou Wuling Motors Co Ltd. Based in Liuzhou, Guangxi Zhuang Autonomous Region, in southwestern China, it makes commercial and consumer vehicles sold in China under the Wuling and Baojun brands.

SGMW has recently found great success as an electric vehicle manufacturer — as of 2021, the venture's Wuling Hongguang Mini EV city car is the best-selling electric car in China by volume.

SAIC Iveco Hongyan 

SAIC Iveco Hongyan was established in January 2003 as Chongqing Hongyan and traces its origins back to a Chinese manufacturer established in 1965. The company is focused on producing Iveco-based heavy trucks which are mostly marketed under the Hongyan marque.

Nanjing Iveco Auto Co Ltd ("New Naveco")

Shanghai Sunwin Bus 
This joint venture produces passenger buses.

SAIC-Charoen Pokphand 
SAIC produces MG Motors vehicles through this joint venture with Charoen Pokphand for their Thailand subsidiary.

Technomous 
Established with Austrian technology provider TTTech in 2018 for Intelligent and Autonomous Driving solutions.

Sales

Facilities

SAIC has numerous production facilities in China, including sites in: Chongqing, Liuzhou, Qingdao, Shanghai, Shenyang, and Yantai. It also had an assembly plant in the United Kingdom, the Longbridge plant, It also has a plant in Chonburi, Thailand, Halol, India and one in Lahore, Pakistan.

Research and development
SAIC operated a large research and development centre in the United Kingdom, the SAIC Motor UK Technical Centre, which as of 2012 employed around 275 engineers and 25 designers. The UK Technical Centre was the principal site worldwide for the development of MG cars, also playing a major role in the development of Roewe products. However in June 2019, SAIC Motor closed the UK Technical Centre making over 300 engineers redundant in the process.

See also

List of automobile manufacturers of China

Notes

External links

 

 
Vehicle manufacturing companies established in 1955
Companies in the CSI 100 Index
Companies listed on the Shanghai Stock Exchange
Car manufacturers of China
Government-owned companies of China
Multinational companies headquartered in China
Chinese brands